Piotr Kamil Malarczyk (born 1 August 1991) is a Polish professional footballer who plays as a centre-back for Korona Kielce.

Malarczyk began his career with Polish club Korona Kielce. After coming through the club’s youth system, he went on to make over 100 appearances for the Korona senior team. In 2015 he moved to English club Ipswich Town, where he spent a single season, including a short loan at Southend United, before returning to Poland to join Cracovia. He spent two years at Cracovia before returning to Korona Kielce in 2018. In 2019 Malarczyk joined Piast Gliwice.

He has won caps for Poland at U19, U20 and U21 levels.

Club career
Malarczyk made his debut for Korona in a 3–2 defeat to Wisła Kraków on 30 October 2009.

Malarczyk joined English Football League Championship club Ipswich Town on 28 August 2015, after Ipswich triggered a buy-out clause inserted into a new one-year deal he had signed in June, which meant he could move on if a foreign club made an offer of 50,000 Polish Zloty, just over £8,500. He made his debut a day later coming on as a substitute in the 2–3 home defeat to Brighton & Hove Albion. He made six appearances for the Championship club during the 2015–16 season.

On 24 March, Malarczyk joined Southend United on loan until the end of the 2015–16 season. He made his debut for Southend in a 0–1 defeat to Bradford City on 30 April. Malarczyk made one further appearance during his loan spell before returning to Ipswich at the end of the season.

International career
Malarczyk has won caps for Poland at U19, U20 and U21 levels.

Career statistics

References

External links

Piotr Malarczyk at Footballdatabase

1991 births
Living people
Sportspeople from Kielce
Polish footballers
Poland youth international footballers
Poland under-21 international footballers
Association football defenders
Korona Kielce players
Ipswich Town F.C. players
Southend United F.C. players
MKS Cracovia (football) players
Piast Gliwice players
Ekstraklasa players
I liga players
III liga players
English Football League players
Polish expatriate footballers
Expatriate footballers in England
Polish expatriate sportspeople in England